The Museum of Modern Art is an art museum in Kuwait City, Kuwait. It hosts a collection of modern Arab and international art. The building  has always served as an educational institution; it was built in 1939 to house the Madrasa Al Sharqiya, or Eastern School in which generations of prominent Kuwaitis studied, including the current Emir, Sheikh Sabah Al Ahmad.

References

External links 
 

2003 establishments in Kuwait
Museums established in 2003
Buildings and structures in Kuwait City
Museums in Kuwait
Cultural centers in Kuwait
Art museums and galleries in Kuwait